The Queensland Cup, currently known as the Hostplus Cup for sponsorship reasons, is the highest-level regional rugby league football competition in Queensland, Australia. It is run by the Queensland Rugby League (QRL)  and is contested by fourteen teams, twelve of which are based in Queensland, with one based in New South Wales and one in Central Province, Papua New Guinea.

The competition is the present-day embodiment of Queensland's top-level club competition. It replaced the Winfield State League in 1996 and accompanied the Brisbane Rugby League, before becoming the premier competition in 1998, following the disbanding of the Brisbane Rugby League.

History

Origin and establishment
Since its inaugural season in 1922, the Brisbane Rugby League was the premier competition in the state of Queensland. Like its counterpart, the Sydney Rugby Football League, the Brisbane Rugby League was thriving, boasting big crowds and large, loyal supporter bases with their respective clubs. The clubs were constant, with new teams rarely entering the competition. However, in 1956, when poker machines ("pokies") were introduced in New South Wales but not in Queensland, Sydney's clubs were able to recruit the best players from Brisbane, Rugby Union and overseas. Within the space of several years, the Sydney Rugby League had come to dominate the code within Australia.

In the 1980s, the NSWRFL began to further expand and supersede the Brisbane competition in popularity and media coverage. In 1982, the first clubs based outside of Sydney, the Canberra Raiders and Illawarra Steelers, were admitted. In 1988, two Queensland-based sides, the Brisbane Broncos and Gold Coast Giants, were formed and gained entry into the competition. The Broncos would sign Brisbane Rugby League stars like Wally Lewis, Gene Miles and Allan Langer. In the space of one season, media coverage and match attendance for the Brisbane Rugby League dropped significantly.

1996–1997: The beginning
In 1996, the Queensland Cup was formed, replacing the Winfield State League, as new federal government laws banned cigarette companies from sponsoring sport. Originally branded the Channel Nine Cup, the 15 round regular season competition featured sixteen teams, fifteen from Queensland and one from Papua New Guinea. At this time it was still considered as the second highest competition in the state, under the Brisbane Rugby League. The Toowoomba Clydesdales were crowned the inaugural premiers, defeating the Redcliffe Dolphins in the Grand Final. In 1997, three teams withdrew from the competition and the Burleigh Bears joined, becoming the first Gold Coast-based side.

1998–2002: Premier competition
In 1998, the competition became the top level of rugby league in the state, following the end of the Brisbane Rugby League. Channel Nine also ended their sponsorship for the 1998 season, with competition going under name, the Queensland Cup. A sixteen-team competition returned in 1998, with the Bundaberg Grizzlies rejoining and the Gold Coast Vikings being formed.

In 1999, the Grizzlies and Vikings both left the competition, as well as inaugural club Brisbane Brothers and the Townsville Stingers, who played just one season.

In 2000, Bundaberg Rum began a two-year sponsorship of the competition and it was known as the Bundy Gold Cup. The 2000 season was also the first in which all twelve teams remained from the season prior. It would not last long though, as the Cairns Cyclones folded after the 2000 season, leaving no north Queensland representation in the competition. In 2002, the North Queensland Young Guns, a Townsville-based North Queensland Cowboys feeder club, were admitted into the competition. At the end of the 2002 season, the Logan Scorpions, an inaugural club, left the competition.

2003–2006: Interstate expansion

In 2003, the Tweed Heads Seagulls joined the competition, becoming the first New South Wales-based side. The club had originally applied for the 2002 season but were unsuccessful. However, following a merger of the Logan Scorpions and Souths Magpies to form the Souths Logan Magpies, a spot was opened up and Tweed Heads were admitted. Another inaugural club would leave the competition in 2004, with the Wests Panthers exiting, and Brothers-Valleys, a merger of Past Brothers and the Fortitude Valley Diehards, joining for a single season.

In 2005, the competition became known as the Queensland Wizard Cup, after Wizard Home Loans became the major sponsor.

2007: Loss of the Clydesdales

Although the QRL had anticipated that the same teams from 2006 would participate in the 2007 competition, it was announced on 5 December 2006 that inaugural club, the Toowoomba Clydesdales, who were the reigning minor premiers, would be withdrawing from the competition for financial reasons. Brisbane Broncos chairman Bruno Cullen said that "It didn't make sense to have this club up there running at what was looking like a $250,000 loss for the year." The following day it was announced that the Aspley Broncos would be replacing the Clydesdales, and acting as the Brisbane Broncos feeder club. The Aspley Broncos would play just a single season in the competition.

The 2007 season marked the first time a team outside of Queensland would win the competition, with the Tweed Heads Seagulls defeating the Redcliffe Dolphins in the Grand Final.

2008–2013: Further expansion

2008 saw the Queensland Cup once again have teams based in the northern cities of Cairns and Mackay after absences of seven and twelve years, respectively. These new teams replaced Aspley and North Queensland as part of the rationalisation of rugby league below the NRL level caused by the introduction of the NRL under 20s competition.

In 2009, the Sunshine Coast Falcons rejoined the competition after thirteen-year absence, after signing a partnership with the Manly Sea Eagles to develop rugby league on the Sunshine Coast. The side played as the Sea Eagles and won the premiership in their first year.

In 2010,  Super was announced as the new major sponsor, with the competition becoming known as the Intrust Super Cup. From 2009 to 2013, the competition featured the same twelve teams for five straight seasons.

2014–2021: Papua New Guinea and Townsville return
In 2014, the PNG Hunters entered the competition, becoming the first Papua New Guinea based side in the competition since the Port Moresby Vipers in 1997. In their inaugural season, the side was based out of the East New Britain town of Kokopo. On 10 September 2014, QRL chairman Peter Betros announced that the Brothers Townsville-led Townsville Blackhawks bid had been successful and the side would compete in the 2015 season.

On 5 October 2014, the Northern Pride became the first Queensland Cup side to win the NRL State Championship, defeating the heavily favoured Penrith Panthers New South Wales Cup side in the inaugural final.

In 2017, the Hunters won their first Queensland Cup premiership, defeating the Sunshine Coast Falcons in the Grand Final and becoming the first team outside of Australia, and the second from outside of Queensland to win the competition.

On 27 March 2020, after round one of the season was completed, the 2020 Intrust Super Cup competition was suspended, and subsequently cancelled for the first time in its history due to the COVID-19 pandemic, with no premiers being crowned. In September 2020, the Easts Tigers re-branded as the Brisbane Tigers for the 2021 season onward. The Tigers had played under the name of Easts or Eastern Suburbs since the formation of the Queensland Cup in 1996.

2022–present: Hostplus Cup
In November 2021, Hostplus became the naming rights sponsor of the competition for the 2022 season, replacing Intrust Super after the two merged.

On July 17, the QRL announced that the Western Clydesdales would enter the competition for the 2023 season, becoming the competition's fifteenth team.

Queensland Cup teams

The Queensland Cup consists of 15 teams, 13 from Queensland, and 1 each from National Capital District and New South Wales, and operates on a single group system, with no divisions or conferences and no relegation and promotion from other leagues.
A number of clubs in the Queensland Cup have an affiliation with a team in the Australian national competition, the National Rugby League.

Current teams

Former teams
As the Queensland Cup initially began as a representative competition that took over the old Winfield State League before becoming a proper club competition, many of the following clubs were "representative" sides that either withdrew (in the case of Mackay and Bundaberg) or folded (Cairns Cyclones and Port Moresby Vipers).

Season structure

Pre-season
The Queensland Cup pre-season typically begins in February and ends in early March. Clubs generally use this time to organise trial matches to test playing combinations. Usually, Queensland Cup teams will play each other in trials, while some face National Rugby League (NRL) sides. For example, in 2018, the Brisbane Broncos played trial matches against the Central Queensland Capras and PNG Hunters.

Regular season
The Queensland Cup regular season usually begins in early March and runs until late August. A round of regular season games is played every weekend for twenty-four weeks. In most rounds, matches are played on Saturday nights/afternoons and Sunday afternoons. Each team receives one bye during the regular season.

The regular season also features a number of themed rounds, where proceeds from the games go to various charities. In 2018, these rounds included ANZAC Round, Indigenous Round, Men of League Round, Women in League Round, "Turn to Me" Round and the annual Country Week.

Country Week

The Queensland Cup has the largest regional footprint of any professional sporting code in Queensland, hosting regular season and trial matches over a large geographical footprint.

It is also unique amongst professional sporting competitions in Australia, since 2012 in partnership with the Queensland Government the Queensland Cup has taken matches to regional Queensland, country towns and cities, to engage fans at a grassroots level. This round usually takes place in July.
 
Locations which have hosted Country Week games include:

 2012: Moranbah, Blackwater, Mount Isa, Kilcoy 
 2013: Roma, Whitsundays, Woodford, Toowoomba, Yarrabah 
 2014: Longreach, Emerald, Moranbah, Mareeba, Kingaroy, Kokopo (Papua New Guinea) 
 2015: Dalby, Blackall, Bundaberg, Charters Towers, Innisfail, Stanthorpe 
 2016: Barcaldine, Charleville, Gympie, Ravenshoe, Mount Isa, Moranbah 
 2017: Bamaga, Clermont, Winton, Mundubbera, St George, Julia Creek 
 2018: Goondiwindi, Maryborough, Cooktown, Normanton, Bowen, Hughenden and Lae (Papua New Guinea) 
 2019: Pittsworth, Thursday Island, Ingham, Nanango and Illfracombe 
 2020: Cancelled due to the COVID-19 pandemic
 2021: Murgon, Chinchilla, Quilpie, Richmond, Dysart, Atherton, Gladstone

In addition to this round games have also been played in regional locations during regular rounds in: Bamaga, Biloelia, Atherton, Hervey Bay, Gladstone, Bundaberg, Barcaldine, Emerald, Woorabinda, Lae (Papua New Guinea) and Stradbroke Island.

Finals Series
The eight highest placed teams at the end of the regular season compete in the finals series. The system consists of a number of games between the top eight teams over four weeks in September, until only two teams remain. These two teams then contest the Grand Final, which is usually played in late September. Over the years, the Queensland Cup has used a number of different finals series systems, usually involving five to six  and now eight teams. In 2019, the current eight team final series system will be adopted.

Grand Final
The Queensland Cup Grand Final, which determines the season's premiers, is one of the state's major sporting events. It is usually contested at Suncorp Stadium, having been held there annually since 2014, although other venues have been used, such as Dolphin Stadium, North Ipswich Reserve and Sunshine Coast Stadium.

The Grand Final had traditionally been played on Saturday afternoons, until moving to Sunday afternoons beginning in 2010.

Since 2007, the player judged to be the man-of-the-match is awarded the prestigious Duncan Hall Medal.

Premiership winners

List of most successful clubs
Teams are ranked in order of premierships won, grand final runners up then minor premierships won. To see the complete list of Queensland Cup records, see List of Queensland Cup records. Team names in bold are the teams currently playing in the Queensland Cup

NRL State Championship Match

Since 2014, The NSW Cup Grand Final Match has been played on the same day as the QLD Cup Grand Final, the weekend prior to the NRL Grand Final, allowing for the creation of the NRL State Championship which saw the NSW Cup premiers face off against the QLD Cup Premiers as a curtain raiser to the NRL Grand Final, originally following the National Youth Competition Grand Final from 2014 to 2017 and following the NRL Women's Grand Final in their inaugural premiership year in 2018.

In 2019 however, the State Championship was the first of three grand finals played on the day, preceding both the NRL Women's premiership and NRL premiership, with the exception of 2020 and 2021 State Championships being cancelled due to COVID-19. Northern Pride and Ipswich Jets became the first and so far only QRL teams to win in as many years with the next three championships won by the NSWRL.

Champions:  Queensland Cup
 Northern Queensland Pride (2014)
 Ipswich Jets (2015)

NRL State Championship Match

Since 2014, The QLD Cup Grand Final Match has been played on the same day as the NSW Cup Grand Final, the weekend prior to the NRL Grand Final, allowing for the creation of the NRL State Championship which saw the QLD Cup premiers face off against the NSW Cup Premiers as a curtain raiser to the NRL Grand Final, originally following the National Youth Competition Grand Final from 2014 to 2017  and following the NRL Women's Grand Final since 2018. In 2019 the NRL State Championship was played prior the NRL Women's Grand Final. The 2020 State Championship was cancelled due to the Queensland and New South Wales competitions being cancelled after Round 1 due to the COVID-19 pandemic, and the 2021 State Championship was cancelled due to the COVID-19 lockdown in Sydney.

NRL State Championship winners

Honours

At the end of each season at the QRL presentation night, the Petero Civoniceva Medal is awarded to the Queensland Cup player voted as the best and fairest over the entire season. Formerly known as The Courier Mail Medal, in 2018, the medal was renamed after former Australian and Queensland representative Petero Civoniceva.  After each game, the referees award three votes to the best player, two votes to the second-best player, and one vote to the third-best player. Previous winners include Australia and Queensland representatives Greg Inglis and Daly Cherry-Evans.

Since 2007, the man of the match in the Grand Final has been awarded the Duncan Hall Medal. The medal is named in honour of ARL Team of the Century member Duncan Hall, who played 24 games for Queensland and 22 games for Australia between 1948 and 1955. Past recipients include Tony Williams and Jake Granville, who would go onto win NRL premierships shortly after their Queensland Cup success.

20th Year Anniversary Team
On 21 September 2015, the QRL announced their Queensland Cup 20th Year Anniversary team. The 17-man team was chosen by a selection panel consisting of Brad Tallon (Queensland Rugby League statistician), Steve Ricketts (rugby league journalist), David Wright (former ABC commentator) and Mike Higgison (rugby league historian).

To be eligible for selection, a player must've played a minimum of 75 games in the competition. Rick Stone, who coached the Burleigh Bears from 1997 to 2005 (winning two premierships), was named coach of the side, while longtime referee Tony Maksoud was included as referee of the team.

Records

The following records are taken from the QRL's official website and are correct as of the end of the 2019 season.

Team
 Most premierships – 6 Redcliffe Dolphins
 Most minor premierships – 6 Redcliffe Dolphins
 Most wooden spoons – 5 Central Queensland Capras
 Highest score in a game – 98, Toowoomba against Western Suburbs Panthers (2003)
 Longest winning streak – 17 matches, Northern Pride (2010-2011)
 Longest undefeated streak – 22 matches, Tweed Heads Seagulls (2010-2011) 
 Longest losing streak- 36 matches, Sunshine Coast Falcons (2013-2014)

Individual
 Most games – Phil Dennis, 282 games
 Most tries – Daniel Ogden, 155 tries
 Most points – Nick Parfitt 1,421 points (113 tries, 483 goals)
 Most points in a season 318, Liam Georgetown (2013) 
 Most tries in a season 34, Daniel Kennedy 2004
 Most points in a game 40, Damien Richter 2002, Greg Bourke 2002
 Most tries in a game 7, Chris Walker 2000, Anthony Zipf 2004

Media coverage & Sponsorship
Although the Queensland Cup has never had the same amount of media coverage that the pre-Brisbane Broncos Brisbane Rugby League did, in recent years it has experienced a resurgence in interest from both the Queensland media and from casual fans alike.

Television
In 2018, the match of the round was televised live on the Nine Network in Queensland at 1:00pm (AEST) on Saturdays. Previously, the match of the round had been broadcast by Nine on Sunday afternoons and before that, on ABC Television on Saturday afternoons. The match is later replayed during the week on Foxtel's Fox League channel. The match of the round returned to Sunday afternoons for the 2019 season.

The non-broadcast games are recorded for highlights and judiciary and coaching purposes.

Radio
From 2006 to 2013, community broadcaster Bay FM began broadcasting Wynnum Manly matches with commentators Mike Higgison and Troy Robbins.

In 2015, a group of community broadcasters including Switch 1197, Valley FM Esk and Phoenix Radio Ipswich began broadcasting matches featuring Ipswich Jets.

Online
Starting from 2022 Queensland Rugby League announced a new streaming deal with Cluch.tv under the website name Qplus.TV where fan can subscribe to watch every game live.

Sponsorship
Due to sponsorship, the Queensland Cup has gone under many different names since first being held in 1996. Originally known as the Channel Nine Cup, it has been known as the Hostplus Cup since 2022.
 Channel Nine Cup (1996–1997)
 Bundy Rum Gold Cup (2000–2001)
 Wizard Cup (2005–2008)
 Intrust Super Cup (2010–2021)
 Hostplus Cup (2022–present)

See also

 Hastings Deering Colts
 FOGS Cup and FOGS Colts Challenge
 Brisbane Rugby League premiership
 Queensland Rugby League
 Winfield State League
 NSW Cup

References

External links

Queensland Cup News
 Queensland Rugby League
 Queensland Rugby League Queensland Cup Page
 Rleague.com's Queensland page
 League Unlimited's Queensland Page

Queensland Rugby League forums
 Rleague's Queensland Forum
 League Unlimited's Queensland Forum

 
Rugby league competitions in Queensland
Recurring sporting events established in 1996
1996 establishments in Australia
Sports leagues established in 1996
Multi-national professional sports leagues